Trachycardium is a genus of molluscs in the family Cardiidae.

Fossil records
This genus is known in the fossil records from the Cretaceous to the Quaternary (age range: from 109.0 to 0.0 million years ago). Fossils are found in the marine strata throughout the world.

Species
Species within this genus include:
 Trachycardium belcheri (Broderip & G. B. Sowerby I, 1829)
 Trachycardium consors (G. B. Sowerby, 1833)
 Trachycardium egmontianum (Shuttleworth, 1856) — Florida prickly cockle
 Trachycardium isocardia  — West Indian prickly cockle
 Trachycardium muricatum (Linnaeus, 1758) — yellow cockle
 Trachycardium procerum (G. B. Sowerby, 1833)  — Slender cockle
 Trachycardium rossi Marwick, 1944

References

Cardiidae
Bivalve genera